Edward Gladstone Wills Power (18 May 1898 – 10 July 1950) was an Australian rules footballer who played with South Melbourne in the Victorian Football League (VFL).

Family
The son of Edward Power, and Eveline Maud Power, née Wills, Edward Gladstone Wills Power was born at Queenscliff, Victoria on 18 May 1898.

He married Lillian Mavis Vorherr (1898-1964) in 1916.

Football

South Melbourne (VFL)

Hawthorn (VFA)
On 30 June 1921, he was granted a clearance to the VFA club Hawthorn, He played in 6 matches in the remainder of the 1921 season.

Death
He died in Adelaide, South Australia on 10 July 1950.

Notes

References

External links 
 
 
 Edward G. "Ed" Power, at The VFA Project.

1898 births
1950 deaths
Australian rules footballers from Victoria (Australia)
Sydney Swans players
Hawthorn Football Club (VFA) players